Chemistry is the second solo album by singer Johnny Gill. It was released on April 22, 1985.

Reception
Richard Harrington of the Washington Post wrote, "Gill is 18. He just sounds older.  On his recent hit single "Half Crazy," Gill's husky, powerful baritone would lead to you to think he'd been around the love wars long enough to do some postgraduate work. But the cover photo for his "Chemistry" album and the "Half Crazy" video show a slightly built kid with a soft, innocent stare, looking like he just got out of high school.  Which he has...For his new album he was teamed with veteran producer and songwriter Linda Creed, who had worked with Thom Bell on the Delfonics', Stylistics' and Spinners' recordings but dropped out of the business for five years to raise her family...That new combination, he feels, is going to put him that much closer to his dream: 'to sell 40 million copies like Michael and then get into the movies.' Luckily Gill's strengths as a ballad singer coincide with commercial radio's currently receptive attitude toward medium tempo, romantic material...But will the world go along with a ballad singer who's so young? 'That's what we've all got to find out very soon,' Gill says evenly. 'I know this one may not go gold. But I'm going to spray paint it.'"

--Excerpted from "The Ballads of Johnny Gill," Washington Post, June 22, 1985

Peter Judge wrote, "This is one of those albums that should have been bigger. Gill is only 18 but as far as singing he can hang with the big boys.  Gill's rich tenor makes a song like "Half Crazy" a real gem.  In a few years, watch out Luther Vandross."

--Excerpted from "Boss Rocked '85," The Rock Hill Herald, January 2, 1986

Track listing
"Half Crazy" (Linda Creed, Lonnie Jordan) – 4:14
"Can't Wait Til Tomorrow" (Barry Alfanzo, Dennis Matkosky, Bill Neale) – 4:45
"Don't Take Away My Pride" (Creed, Jordan, Freeman King, Kent Perkins) – 4:30
"One Small Light" (Dennis Matkosky, Dan Sembello, Kathy Wakefield) – 4:13
"The Way That You Love Me" (Bobby Caldwell, Jason Schees, Aaron Zigman) – 4:20
"Because of You" (Creed, Leslie Hall, John Lind, Matkosky) – 5:42
"Chemistry" (Matkosky, Richard Wolf) – 4:44
"I Found Love" (Monty Seward, Deniece Williams) – 3:26

Personnel
Johnny Gill - lead vocals
Darryl Phinnessee, Edie Lehmann, Jim Gilstrap, Lynn Davis, Lonnie Jordan, Monte Seward, Linda Creed - backing Vocals
Jeff Baxter (solo and guitar synth on track 5), Paul Jackson Jr., Bill Neale (twelve-string on track 6) - guitars
Russell Ferrante - keyboards, acoustic and Fender Rhodes electric piano
Kevin Grady, Dan Sembello, Stewart Levine, Monte Seward - synthesizers
Dennis Matkosky - synthesizers, Linn and Simmons drum programming
Ray Nealpolitan, Reggie McBride, Louis Johnson, Neil Stubenhaus, Abraham Laboriel - bass
Ricky Lawson - drums
Paulinho da Costa - percussion

Charts
Album - Billboard (United States)

Singles - Billboard (United States)

Personnel
Johnny Gill – Vocals
Linda Creed – Background Vocals, Producer
Scott MacMinn – Assistant Engineer
Michael Mason – Overdubs, Drum Programming, Assistant Engineer
Dennis Matkosky – Synthesizer, Rhythm Arrangements, Producer
Reggie McBride – Bass
Sy Mitchell – Engineer
Bill Neale – 12-String Guitar, Conductor, Producer, Rhythm Arrangements
Ray Neapolitan – Bass
Darryl Phinnessee – Background Vocals
Marc Russo – Saxophone
Danny Sembello – Synthesizer
Monty Seward – Synthesizer, Background Vocals
Neil Stubenhaus – Bass
Joe Tarsia – Engineer
Howard Lee Wolen – Mixing
Richard Wolf – Songwriter
Casey Young – Synthesizer
Jay Willis – Assistant Engineer
Thom Wilson – Engineer, Mixing
David Koenig – Assistant Engineer
Clyde Kaplan – Assistant Engineer
Joe Borja – Assistant Engineer
Frank Moscati – Photography
Zal Schreiber – Mastering
Robert Lagarza – Assistant Engineer
Glen McKee – Assistant Engineer
Audrey Satterwhite – Art Direction
Rob Weaver – Assistant Engineer
Barry Craig – Assistant Engineer
Lonnie Jordan – Background Vocals
Gene Page – Conductor, String Arrangements
Jeff Baxter – Guitar, Guitar (Synthesizer)
Les Brockman – Engineer
Paulinho Da Costa – Percussion
Lynn Davis – Background Vocals
Don Renaldo – Concert Master
Russell Ferrante – Piano, Keyboards, Fender Rhodes
Jim Gilstrap – Background Vocals
Kevin Grady – Synthesizer
Gary Grant – Trumpet
Jerry Hey – Trumpet, Horn Arrangements
Alan Hirshberg – Engineer
Paul Jackson, Jr. – Guitar
Louis Johnson – Bass
Abraham Laboriel – Bass
Ricky Lawson – Drums
Edie Lehmann – Background Vocals
Gene Leone – Engineer 
Stewart Levine – Synthesizer
Bill Reichenbach Jr. – Trombone

References

1985 albums
Atlantic Records albums
Johnny Gill albums